Oren Bar-Gill is an Israeli-American lawyer, economist, and academic. He is William J. Friedman and Alicia Townsend Friedman Professor of Law and Economics at Harvard Law School, and a Sackler Fellow at Tel Aviv University. He is most known for his research in contract law (especially consumer contracts), law and economics, and behavioral law and economics.

Bar-Gill is the author of a book entitled, Seduction by Contract: Law, Economics, and Psychology in Consumer Markets, and has published over 60 academic articles. His research spans the field of consumer economics, with particular emphasis on the relationships between consumers and commercial entities, and consumer psychology, and it derives legal policy implications aimed at helping consumers. Since 2005, he has been serving as Council Member for Gerson Lehrman Group. He is the Editor-in-Chief of Journal of Legal Analysis, Associate Editor of Behavioral Science & Policy, and is associated with the advisory boards of Singapore Journal of Legal Studies, U.S. Financial Diaries, and Berlin Center for Consumer Policies, He serves (together with Omri Ben-Shahar and Florencia Marotta-Wurgler) as Reporter for the Restatement of the Law, Consumer Contracts.

Early life and education
Bar-Gill was born in 1975 in Israel to parents Aharon and Nechama. Being raised in Israel, he completed his high school studies at Ort Kiryat Bialik in 1992. He graduated from Tel-Aviv University with a B.A. degree in economics in 1995. He then earned an LL.B., as well as an M.A. degree in Law and Economics from Tel-Aviv University in 1996. He has two doctorate degrees, in economics and in law. Prior to receiving a Ph.D. degree in economics at Tel-Aviv University in 2002, he enrolled at Harvard Law School and earned an LL.M. degree in 2001. Later on, he completed his S.J.D. (Doctorate in Law) from Harvard Law School, with a dissertation titled "Essays in Law and Economics."

Career
Bar-Gill started his academic career as a Junior Fellow at Harvard University's Society of Fellows, from 2002 until 2004. In 2005, he became an assistant professor at New York University School of Law. He was promoted to associate professor in 2007, and to Professor in 2009. In 2013, he became the Evelyn and Harold Meltzer Professor of Law and Economics at New York University School of Law. In 2014, he moved to Harvard Law School, where he serves as William J. Friedman and Alicia Townsend Friedman Professor of Law and Economics. Bar-Gill has also been serving as Sackler Fellow and visiting professor of law at Tel Aviv University since 2017.

Bar-Gill was the Director of the NYU Center for Law, Economics and Organization from 2009 until 2013.

Research
Bar-Gill has published a book and over 60 articles on topics related to contracts (with a focus on consumer contracts), law and economics, and behavioral law and economics. His research has been featured by numerous magazines, such as The New Republic, Time, The Regulatory Review, Slate, and The Intercept.

Bar-Gill's book, Seduction by Contract: Law, Economics and Psychology in Consumer Markets, explores how consumer contracts emerge from the interaction between market forces and consumer psychology. Adam B. Badawi regards Bar-Gill as "one of the foremost and influential proponents of a behaviorist take on contracts," and notes Bar-Gill's portrayal of "consumers as the targets of temptation." Hugh Collins is of the view that the book "consists of a detailed explanation of [the interaction between market forces and consumer psychology], exploring credit cards, mortgages, and cell phones."

In other work, Bar-Gill argued for establishing the Consumer Financial Protection Bureau (CFPB), explaining that, prior to the creation of the CFPB, regulators with authority to police Consumer Financial Products (CFPs) lack the motivation to do so and that regulators with motivation to protect consumers lack authority over important CFP sellers. In his article, titled "Seduction by contract: do we understand the documents we sign?" he described how policymakers are paying increasing attention to the problem of how behavioral market failures hurt consumers and undermine efficiency, and are responding with increasingly sophisticated regulatory tools. He also highlighted the dire need for designing "disclosures that can really empower consumers and solve the behavioral market failure." In 2021, Bar-Gill, together with Omri Ben-Shahar from the University of Chicago, developed a new theory of manipulation in consumer markets—one that focuses on how truthful information is prioritized.

In his 2019 study, Bar-Gill provided an account of simple disclosures like genetically modified food disclosures, and how they might cause market distortions and inefficiencies, when consumers draw false inferences from the disclosure, and when the disclosure of one dimension elevates this dimension at the expense of other dimensions, and consequently distorts demand for the product and might even alter the product itself. More recently, he presented his viewpoints on the relationship that exists between the informational content of willingness to pay (WTP) and the wealth distribution, while discussing the effect of forward-looking rationality on the WTP measure. Furthermore, in an article co-authored with Ariel Porat from Tel Aviv University, Bar-Gill highlighted how the prospect of a sale affects the seller's incentive to investigate, and what possible impact the disclosure rules of contract law have on the investigation decision.

Awards and honors
1999-2000 - Cegla Fellowship, Tel-Aviv University School of Law
2000-2001 - Gammon Fellowship, Harvard Law School
2000-2002 - Fulbright Fellowship
2000-2002 - Graduate Fellowship, Harvard Law School
2000-2004 - Olin Fellowship in Law, Economics and Business, Harvard Law School
2003 - Recipient of a research grant from the William F. Milton Fund, Harvard University
2003 - Olin Prize for Best Paper in Law and Economics, Harvard Law School 
2009 - Best Paper Award, American College of Consumer Financial Services Lawyers
2011 - Young Scholar Medal, American Law Institute
2013 - Podell Distinguished Teaching Award
2013 - "Teacher of the Year" Award, Association of American Law Schools (AALS)
2017 - Best Paper Prize, American Law and Economics Review

Bibliography

Books
Seduction by Contract: Law, Economics, and Psychology in Consumer Markets (2012) ISBN 9780199663361

Selected articles
Bar-Gill, O., & Bebchuk, L. A. (2002). Misreporting corporate performance. Harvard law and economics discussion paper.
Bar-Gill, O. (2003). Seduction by plastic. Nw. UL Rev., 98, 1373.
Bar-Gill, O. (2007). The behavioral economics of consumer contracts. Minn. L. Rev., 92, 749.
Bar-Gill, O. (2008). The law, economics and psychology of subprime mortgage contracts. Cornell L. Rev., 94, 1073.
Bar-Gill, O., & Warren, E. (2008). Making credit safer. U. Pa. L. Rev., 157, 1.
Bar-Gill, O., & Persico, N. (2016). Exchange Efficiency with Weak Ownership Rights. American Economic Journal: Microeconomics 8, 230.
Bar-Gill, O. (2019). Algortihmic Price Discrimination: When Demand Is a Function of Both Preferences and (Mis)perceptions. University of Chicago Law Review 86, 217.
Bar-Gill, O., & Porat, A. (2020). Disclosure Rules in Contract Law. Journal of Legal Studies, 49, 103.

References 

Living people
1975 births
American people of Israeli descent
Israeli lawyers
Israeli economists
Israeli academics
Tel Aviv University alumni
Harvard Law School alumni
New York University School of Law faculty